Tami Grende and Ye Qiuyu were the defending champions, but chose not to participate.

Dalma Gálfi and Fanny Stollár won the title after defeating Vera Lapko and Tereza Mihalíková 6–3, 6–2 in the final.

Seeds

Draw

Finals

Top half

Bottom half

External links 
 Main draw

Girls' Doubles
Wimbledon Championship by year – Girls' doubles